Bruce D. Roth is an American organic and medicinal chemist who trained at Iowa State University and the University of Rochester, and, at the age of 32, discovered atorvastatin, the statin-class drug sold as Lipitor that would become the largest-selling drug in pharmaceutical history (as of 2003). His honours include being named a 2008 Hero of Chemistry by the American Chemical Society, and being chosen as the Perkin Medal awardee, the highest honour given in the U.S. chemical industry, by the Society of Chemical Industry, American section in 2013.

Early life and education 

Roth received his undergraduate degree in Chemistry from Saint Joseph's College, Philadelphia, in 1976. He then went to Iowa State University as a doctoral student under George Kraus, receiving his Ph.D. in organic chemistry in 1981. He then spent a year as a Postdoctoral Fellow with A.S. Kende at the University of Rochester.

Career
Roth has held a number of positions in his career, from "Scientist" (medicinal chemist) through to vice president-level positions in drug discovery, and his accomplishments in his career include the discovery of the molecule atorvastatin, which would become the drug Lipitor.

Positions
In 1982, 28-year-old Roth began work as a medicinal chemist for the Parke Davis research area of Warner-Lambert, becoming the chemistry co-chair of the statins effort, with biologist Roger Newton, in 1984. By 1985, he was at Warner-Lambert's Parke-Davis Pharmaceutical Research facility in Ann Arbor, Michigan. He was promoted to Research Associate in 1986, Senior Research Associate in 1988, Section Director in 1990, Director of Atherosclerosis and Exploratory Chemistry in 1992, and Senior Director of Atherosclerosis, Inflammation and Exploratory Chemistry in 1993.
By the early 1990s he held managerial positions and was no longer doing laboratory work. In 2000 Warner-Lambert acquired Parke-Davis. He was appointed Vice President of Chemistry just prior to the merger between Warner-Lambert and Pfizer in 2000 and remained in that role as a part of Pfizer Global Research and Development in Ann Arbor, Michigan until 2007. He then joined Genentech in San Francisco, California as Vice President of Discovery Chemistry.

Atorvastatin
Before atorvastatin, Roth worked to develop a different drug, but Sandoz AG beat his team to a patent. In 1985, while working at Warner-Lambert's Parke-Davis research facility, Roth "identified a molecule" that inhibited HMG CoA reductase, a "key enzyme in the metabolic pathway the body uses to produce cholesterol."

Roth was listed as the inventor of trans-6-[2-(3- or 4-carboxamido-substituted pyrrol-1-yl)alkyl]-4-hydroxypyran-2-one, patented in 1986, and developed into the on-market drug, atorvastatin, which ultimately would be sold as Lipitor, and which would become the largest-selling drug in pharmaceutical history by 2003. Pfizer acquired Warner-Lambert and Lipitor in 2000.

Other activities
From 1996 until 2007, Roth served as an adjunct professor in the Department of Medicinal Chemistry at the University of Michigan.

Awards and honours
For the discovery of atorvastatin, Roth received the 1997 Warner-Lambert Chairman's Distinguished Scientific Achievement Award, the 1999 Inventor of the Year Award from the New York Intellectual Property Law Association, the 2003 American Chemical Society Award for Creative Invention, the 2003 Gustavus John Esselen Award for Chemistry in the Public Service, the 2005 Iowa State University Distinguished Alumni Award, and the 2006 Pfizer Global Research and Development Achievement Award. Roth was named a 2008 Hero of Chemistry by the American Chemical Society. In 2013, he was chosen as the Perkin Medal awardee, the highest honour given in the U.S. chemical industry, by the Society of Chemical Industry, American section, for his innovation in applied chemistry that resulted in the outstanding commercial success of atorvastatin.

Representative publications 

According to the Chemical Heritage Foundation, in "addition to his discovery of atorvastatin, Roth is the inventor or co-inventor of 42 patents and the author or co-author of 48 manuscripts, 35 published abstracts and eight book chapters."

His publications include:
 
 
 
 
 
 
 
 Roth BD, Bocan TMA, Blankley CJ, Chucholowski AW, Creger PL, Creswell MW, Ferguson E, Newton RS, O'Brien P, Picard JA, Roark WH, Sekerke CS, Sliskovic DR, Wilson MW. The Relationship Between Tissue Selectivity and Lipophilicity for Inhibitors of HMG-CoA Reductase. J. Med. Chem. 1991, 34, 463-6.

Further reading
The following are good sources from which further information on the article's subject may be found, that may be of interest to readers and article editors. It includes sources not yet cited, and sources whose content may yet provide further insights into the subject.
 
 
 Roth, Bruce D. (2003) "Discovery and development of Lipitor (atorvastatin calcium)," ACS Award for Creative Invention Symposium: New Therapies for Atherosclerosis, MEDI 158 (March 24), The 225th ACS National Meeting, New Orleans, LA, March 23–27, 2003.

References

External links 
 Ann Arbor chemist wins national award for drug discovery - ScienceBlog
 Bruce D. Roth, Pfizer Inc, USA

21st-century American chemists
Iowa State University alumni
Living people
University of Michigan faculty